The West Coast Morethia skink or western pale-flecked Morethia  (Morethia lineoocellata) is a species of skink found in Western Australia.

References

Morethia
Reptiles described in 1839
Skinks of Australia
Endemic fauna of Australia
Taxa named by André Marie Constant Duméril
Taxa named by Gabriel Bibron